The ST postcode area, also known as the Stoke-on-Trent postcode area, is a group of 21 postcode districts in England, within six post towns. These cover much of north and central Staffordshire (including Stoke-on-Trent, Stafford, Leek, Newcastle-under-Lyme, Stone and Uttoxeter), plus very small parts of Cheshire and Derbyshire.



Coverage
The approximate coverage of the postcode districts:

|-
! ST1
| STOKE-ON-TRENT
| Hanley, Cobridge, Sneyd Green, Birches Head, Shelton
| Stoke-on-Trent
|-
! ST2
| STOKE-ON-TRENT
| Bentilee, Abbey Hulton, Bucknall
| Stoke-on-Trent, Staffordshire Moorlands
|-
! ST3
| STOKE-ON-TRENT
| Longton, Meir, Blurton, Weston Coyney
| Stoke-on-Trent, Stafford, Staffordshire Moorlands
|-
! ST4
| STOKE-ON-TRENT
| Stoke, Fenton, Penkhull, Trentham
| Stoke-on-Trent, Stafford
|-
! ST5
| NEWCASTLE
| Newcastle-under-Lyme, Keele, Chesterton
| Newcastle-under-Lyme, Stafford
|-
! ST6
| STOKE-ON-TRENT
| Tunstall, Burslem, Smallthorne, Brown Edge
| Stoke-on-Trent, Staffordshire Moorlands
|-
! ST7
| STOKE-ON-TRENT
| Kidsgrove, Talke, Talke Pits, Alsager, Mow Cop, Audley
| Newcastle-under-Lyme, Cheshire East, Stoke-on-Trent, Staffordshire Moorlands
|-
! ST8
| STOKE-ON-TRENT
| Biddulph
| Staffordshire Moorlands, Stoke-on-Trent
|-
! ST9
| STOKE-ON-TRENT
| Werrington, Endon
| Staffordshire Moorlands, Stoke-on-Trent
|-
! ST10
| STOKE-ON-TRENT
| Cheadle, Church Leigh, Tean, Alton
| Staffordshire Moorlands, East Staffordshire
|-
! ST11
| STOKE-ON-TRENT
| Blythe Bridge, Forsbrook, Caverswall
| Staffordshire Moorlands, Stafford
|-
! ST12
| STOKE-ON-TRENT
| Barlaston
| Stafford, Stoke-on-Trent
|-
! ST13
| LEEK
| Leek
| Staffordshire Moorlands
|-
! ST14
| UTTOXETER
| Uttoxeter, Bramshall, Stramshall
| East Staffordshire, Derbyshire Dales
|-
! ST15
| STONE
| Stone
| Stafford, Staffordshire Moorlands
|-
! ST16
| STAFFORD
| Stafford
| Stafford
|-
! ST17
| STAFFORD
| Stafford
| Stafford, South Staffordshire
|-
! ST18
| STAFFORD
| Stafford
| Stafford, South Staffordshire, East Staffordshire
|-
! ST19
| STAFFORD
| Penkridge, Rodbaston
| South Staffordshire
|-
! ST20
| STAFFORD
| Stafford, Woodseaves, Norbury
| Stafford
|-
! ST21
| STAFFORD
| Stafford, Eccleshall
| Stafford
|}

Map

See also
Postcode Address File
List of postcode areas in the United Kingdom

References

External links
Royal Mail's Postcode Address File
A quick introduction to Royal Mail's Postcode Address File (PAF)

Areas of Stoke-on-Trent
Postcode areas covering the West Midlands (region)